Daniel Mąka (born 30 April 1988) is a Polish former professional footballer who played as a midfielder. He is also a member of the Widzew Łódź's academy training staff.

Career

Club
Mąka scored his first goal in the Ekstraklasa on his debut, the first game of the 2008/2009 campaign, which was also the first "derby" for Mąka, against Polonia's fierce rivals Legia Warsaw. The match ended 2-2. Only five games later, he scored his first hat-trick (coming on from the bench on 57') against Polonia Bytom in a 4-0 victory.

In the summer 2010 he was loaned to Polish First League club Termalica Bruk-Bet Nieciecza. He returned to Polonia one year later, but couldn't fit into first team so has been moved to reserve team. After that, he decided to cancel his agreement by mutual consent.

In August 2011, he joined Polonia Bytom on a two-year contract.

On 20 January 2021, Daniel Mąka joined the liga okręgowa's reserve team of Widzew Łódź and become a member of the club's academy training staff. He signed a contract by the end of June 2021, with an option to extend it for one year if the reserves are promoted to the IV liga.

References

External links 
 

1988 births
Living people
Polish footballers
Poland under-21 international footballers
Polonia Warsaw players
Bruk-Bet Termalica Nieciecza players
Polonia Bytom players
Zawisza Bydgoszcz players
GKS Tychy players
Widzew Łódź players
Ekstraklasa players
I liga players
II liga players
Footballers from Warsaw
Association football forwards